Underwater rugby in Colombia is played in a system of three major club events per year, with an inter-leagues tournament at the end of each year. From the preceding year's World Cup or major CMAS underwater rugby event, the country's best players are selected to be part of the national team.

Club competition
There are three major events each year, each of which includes every club team. Set for March, June, and October of each year, the events generally involve both women's and men's competitions.

Inter-leagues tournament
Each year is concluded with a final inter-leagues tournament. Since some departments in the country have several teams, a qualifying event is held first. The best players from each department advance to the final tournament, which is usually played in December.

U-21 tournament
To promote youth involvement in underwater rugby and make the game more attractive to newcomers, an Under-21 (U-21) tournament is also held semiannually. It is generally held in August during years preceding major worldwide events for which a national team is selected.

Colombian clubs

References

Sport in Colombia by sport
Underwater rugby